Joseph Tetley may refer to:

 Joe Tetley (born 1995), English cricketer
 Joseph Dresser Tetley, member of the New Zealand Legislative Council